George Cunningham may refer to:
George Cunningham (British politician) (1931–2018), British politician
George Cunningham (baseball) (1894–1972), baseball player
George Cunningham (footballer) (1892–?), Scottish footballer
Sir George Cunningham (civil servant) (1888–1963), administrator in British India
G. D. Cunningham (George Dorrington Cunningham, 1878–1948), English organist
George T. Cunningham, founder of Cunningham's, a British Columbia pharmacy chain
G. H. Cunningham (George Herriot Cunningham, 1892–1962), New Zealand mycologist and plant pathologist
George I. Cunningham (1835–1902), mayor of Charleston, South Carolina
George Cunningham (Arizona politician) (born 1945), member of the Arizona House of Representatives